Sphenomorphinae is a large subfamily of skinks, lizards within the family Scincidae. The genera in this subfamily were previously found to belong to the Sphenomorphus group in the large subfamily Lygosominae.

Genera

The subfamily Sphenomorphinae contains 591 species in 41 genera.

 Anomalopus (4 species)
 Asymblepharus (3 species)
 Calorodius (1 species)
 Calyptotis (4 species)
 Coeranoscincus (2 species)
 Coggeria (1 species)
 Concinnia (7 species)
 Ctenotus (103 species)
 Eremiascincus (15 species)
 Eulamprus (5 species)
 Fojia (1 species)
 Glaphyromorphus (11 species)
 Gnypetoscincus (1 species)
 Hemiergis (7 species)
 Insulasaurus (4 species)
 Isopachys (4 species)
 Kaestlea (5 species)
 Lankascincus (10 species)
 Larutia (9 species)
 Leptoseps (2 species)
 Lerista (97 species)
 Lipinia (28 species)
 Nangura (1 species)
 Notoscincus (2 species)
 Ophioscincus (3 species)
 Ornithuroscincus (9 species)
 Orosaura (1 species)
 Palaia (1 species)
 Papuascincus (4 species)
 Parvoscincus (24 species)
 Pinoyscincus (5 species)
 Praeteropus (4 species)
 Prasinohaema (5 species)
 Ristella (4 species)
 Saiphos (1 species)
 Scincella (38 species)
 Sepsiscus (1 species)
 Silvascincus (2 species)
 Sphenomorphus (113 species) 
 Tropidophorus (29 species)
 Tumbunascincus (1 species)
 Tytthoscincus (23 species)

References